The 2014–15 Cuban National Series was the 54th season of the league. Ciego de Ávila defeated Isla de la Juventud in the series' final round. This was the first finals appearance for Isla de la Juventud, and the third for Ciego de Ávila.

References

Cuban National Series seasons
Cuban National Series
Cuban National Series